The 2009 SAFF Championship was an international football tournament held in Bangladesh from 3 to 14 June 2009. The 8 national teams involved in the tournament were required to register a squad of 20 players. The position listed for each player is per the squad list in the official match reports by the SAFF.

Maldives
Coach:  István Urbányi
 Ahmed Thoriq
 Mohamed Imran
 Ibrahim Fazeel
 Mohamed Jameel
 Ali Ashfaq
 Abdul Akram Ghanee
 Mukhutar Naseer
 Mohamed Umair
 Shamveel Qasim
 Mohamed Bakka Arif
 Mohamed Sobah
 Ashed Adey Ali
 Mohamed Shifan
 Ahmed Rasheed

India
Coach:  Sukhwinder Singh
Arindam Bhattacharya
Laxmikant Kattimani
Denzil Franco
D. Ravanan
Nirmal Chettri
Naoba Singh
Rowilson Rodrigues
Robert Lalthalma
Ravinder Singh
Jagpreet Singh
Baldip Singh
Manish Maithani
Jibon Singh
Jewel Raja
Joaquim Abranches
Balwant Singh
Sushil Kumar Singh
Jagtar Singh
Jeje Lalpekhlua

Bangladesh
Coach:  Shahidur Rahman Shantoo
Mehedi Hasan Ujjal
Rajani Kanta Barman
Aminul Haque
Waly Faisal
Mohammed Ariful Islam
Enamul Haque
Nasirul Islam Nasir
Mamun Miah
Mamunul Islam
Zahid Hasan Ameli
Pranotosh Kumar Das
Arman Aziz
Zahid Parvez Chowdhury
Atiqur Rahman Meshu
Shahedul Islam Ripon

Pakistan
Coach:  György Kottán
Muhammad Essa
Arif Mehmood
Muhammad Naeem Shahid
Abdul Aziz
Safiullah Khan
Adnan Ahmed
Amjad Iqbal
Amir Gul Chhutto
Atif Bashir
Shabir Khan
Mehmood Ali
Reis Ashraf
Jadid Khan Pathan
Nasrullah Khan

Bhutan
Coach:  Koji Gyotoku
Passang Tshering
Kinley Dorji
Perma Chophel
Sonam Tenzin
Kinley Wangchuk
Nawang Dhendup
Sangay Khandu
Chimi C. Dorji
Leki Dukpa
Tandin Tshering
Karun Gurung
Dawa Gyeltshen
Chencho Nio

Nepal
Coach:  Krishna Thapa
Sagar Thapa
Bikash Malla
K.C. Anjan
Bijay Gurung
Raju Tamang
Ju Manu Rai
Anil Gurung
Biraj Maharajan
Sandeep Rai
Rohit Chand
Chetan Ghimire
Yogesh Shrestha
Santosh Sahukhala

Afghanistan
Coach:  Mohammad Yousef Kargar
Zohib Islam Amiri
Sayed Maqsood Hashimi
Hafizullah Qadami
Ali Ahmad Yarzada
Hamidullah Yousufzai
Sayed Bashir Azimi
Hashmatullah Barakzai
Israfeel Kohistani
Saboor Khalili
Zakria Rezai
Muqadar Qazizadah
Ali Azara
Faisal Sakhizada
Waheed Ahmad Nadeem

Sri Lanka
Coach:  Sampath Perera
 Kasun Jayasuriya
 Channa Ediri Bandanage
 Chathura Maduranga Weerasinghe
Mohamed Asmeer Latif
 Yelendran Sadhishkumar
 Wellala Hettige Gunaratne
Arachchige Pradeep Kumara
Duminda Wasantha Hettiarachichi
Shanmugarajah Sanjeev
Kolitha Chathuranga Kumara
Asanka Rangana Arachchige
Rathnayake Nawarathna Warakagoda
Nipuna Bandara Liyana
Mohamed Naufer Izzadeen

References

2009 SAFF Championship
SAFF Championship squads
Association football tournament squads